Merrimon Cuninggim (1911–1995) was a Methodist minister and university administrator.

Early life
Augustus Merrimon Cuninggim was born on May 11, 1911 in Nashville, Tennessee. His father, Jesse Lee Cuninggim, was a Methodist minister who moved Scarritt College from Kansas City, Missouri to Nashville, and later taught at Vanderbilt University in Nashville. His mother was Maud Merrimon Cuninggim. His sister, Margaret Cuninggim, served as Dean of Women at the University of Tennessee and later at Vanderbilt University in Nashville.

Cuninggim graduated from Vanderbilt University and went on to earn a Master's degree in English from Duke University, followed by a Bachelor's degree and a Master's degree in History from the University of Oxford and a Bachelor of Divinity and a PhD in Education from Yale University.

Career
In the 1940s, Cuninggim was Professor of Religion at Emory and Henry College in Emory, Virginia and later at Denison University in Granville, Ohio. During the Second World War, he served as a chaplain in the United States Navy from 1944 to 1946. From 1946 to 1951, he was Professor of Religion at Pomona College in Claremont, California.

From 1951 to 1960, Cuninggim served as Dean of Perkins School of Theology at Southern Methodist University in Dallas, Texas. During his tenure, in 1952, he successfully led the drive to racially integrate, making it the first desegregated graduate school in the American South.

Cuninggim served as the Executive Director of the Danforth Foundation from 1960 to 1973.

Later, Cuninggim also served as the President of Salem College in Winston-Salem, North Carolina from 1976 to 1979. He also served on the Boards of Trustees of his alma mater, Vanderbilt University and Duke University.

Cuninggim founded The Center for Effective Philanthropy in 1979. From 1979 to his death in 1995, he was a consultant for the Duke Endowment, the Lilly Endowment, the National Endowment for the Humanities, the Association of Governing Boards of Universities and Colleges, the Z. Smith Reynolds Foundation, and the Rockefeller Foundation. He also served as a consultant for the Margaret Cuninggim Women's Center at Vanderbilt University, named in honor of his sister.

Tennis
Cuninggim was a ranked tennis player who competed at Wimbledon and Forest Hills. At Pomona College, he was both the tennis coach and the chairman of the Religious Department.

Personal life and death
Cuninggim was married to Annie Whitty Daniel. They had three daughters, Lee Neff, Terry and Peneloppe Cuninggim.

He died on November 1, 1995 in Cockeysville, Maryland.

Bibliography
The College Seeks Religion (1948)
Freedom's Holy Light (1955)
Christianity & Communism (with others, 1958)
The Protestant Stake in Higher Education (1961)
Private Money and Public Service: The Role of the Foundation in American Society (1972)
Church-Related Higher Education (with others, 1979)
Letters to a Foundation Trustee: What We Need to Know About Foundations and Their Management (1991)
Uneasy Partners: the College & the Church (1994)

References

1911 births
1995 deaths
People from Nashville, Tennessee
Vanderbilt University alumni
Duke University alumni
Alumni of Merton College, Oxford
Emory and Henry College faculty
Denison University faculty
Southern Methodist University faculty
Heads of universities and colleges in the United States
Methodists from Tennessee
Yale Divinity School alumni
American Rhodes Scholars
American male tennis players
Pomona College faculty
Methodists from Texas